The Nations Cup was a non-ranking team snooker tournament created in 1999, and the second team tournament after the World Cup. The annual contests featured team of four players representing their country against other such teams.

History
The event began in the 1998/1999 season. It was held at the Telewest Arena, Newcastle upon Tyne. The five home countries participated, who were represented by four player teams and were identified by coloured waistcoats. It was played on a round robin basis with the top two meeting in the final. For the final two years the event moved to the Hexagon Theatre in Reading. In 2001 there were eight teams, as Thailand, Malta and China joined the competition. Teams consisted of three players and were split into two round robin groups, from where the top two teams advanced to the semi-finals. It was planned to rename the event to World Cup in 2002, but it was abandoned because ITV discontinued their snooker coverage.

Winners

See also
World Cup (snooker)

References

Nations Cup (snooker)
Snooker non-ranking competitions
Snooker competitions in England
Recurring sporting events established in 1999
Recurring sporting events disestablished in 2001
1999 establishments in England
2001 disestablishments in England
Defunct snooker competitions
Defunct sports competitions in England